Benjamin D. Brantley (born October 26, 1954) is an American theater critic, journalist, editor, publisher and writer. He served as the chief theater critic for The New York Times from 1996 to 2017, and as co-chief theater critic from 2017 to 2020.

Life and career
Born in Durham, North Carolina, Brantley received a Bachelor of Arts in English from Swarthmore College in Pennsylvania, graduating in 1977, and is a member of the Phi Beta Kappa Society.

Brantley began his journalism career  as a summer intern at the Winston-Salem Sentinel and, in 1975, became an editorial assistant at The Village Voice. At Women's Wear Daily, he was a reporter and then editor (1978-January 1983), and later became the European editor, publisher, and Paris bureau chief until June 1985.

For the next 18 months, Brantley freelanced, writing regularly for Elle, Vanity Fair, and The New Yorker before joining The New York Times as a Drama Critic (August 1993). He was elevated to Chief Theater Critic three years later.

Brantley is the editor of The New York Times Book of Broadway: On the Aisle for the Unforgettable Plays of the Last Century, a compilation of 125 reviews published by St. Martin's Press in 2001. He received the George Jean Nathan Award for Dramatic Criticism for 1996-1997. He is the subject of the website, DidHeLikeIt.com, that uses a "Ben-Ometer" to translate current Broadway show reviews. The website also has reviews from Newsday, New York Daily News, AmNY, Variety, USA Today, and other major publications.

Brantley has been dubbed a "celebrity underminer." In an article in The New York Times, published on January 3, 2010, he expressed his ambivalence about the "unprecedented heights" of "star worship on Broadway during the past 10 years."

In July 2018, Brantley was criticized by some members of Twitter for his review of the musical Head Over Heels. Many considered the review to be transphobic and read it as misgendering the principal character played by Peppermint. To address the criticism, the Times edited the review and Brantley apologized for it, writing that he had tried to "reflect the light tone of the show."

On September 10, 2020, Brantley announced he would step down from his position as co-chief theater critic for the Times, effective October 15.

Personal life
Brantley, who is gay, is single and lives in New York City.

See also
 LGBT culture in New York City
 List of LGBT people from New York City
 New Yorkers in journalism

References

External links
Ben Brantley at The New York Times.
DidHeLikeIt.com review aggregator

1954 births
Living people
20th-century American journalists
American male journalists
21st-century American journalists
American theater critics
Critics employed by The New York Times
American gay writers
Journalists from North Carolina
LGBT people from North Carolina
Swarthmore College alumni
Writers from Durham, North Carolina
21st-century American LGBT people